In the run up to the 2015 Polish parliamentary election, various organisations carry out opinion polling to gauge voting intention in Poland. Results of such polls are displayed in this article.

The date range for these opinion polls are from the previous parliamentary election, held on 9 October 2011, to 23 October 2015.

Opinion polls

Graphical summary

Poll results

2015

2014

2013

2012

2011

Notes

References

Poland
2015